Alfredo Pires (born 1964 in Lolotoe) is an East Timorese politician. In 2002, Alfredo Pires was chosen by the Prime Minister of East Timor, Xanana Gusmão to serve as the Secretary of State for Natural Resources in Timor-Leste and is responsible for petroleum and mineral resources. Minister for Natural Resources was Gusmão, too. 2012 Pires took the minister rang over.

As Secretary of State, Mr. Pires’ priority is to develop Timorese human resources and engage the Timorese people in the petroleum industry. With a team of young, dedicated Timorese geologists and engineers, he is spearheading the petroleum sector reform with the creation of the National Petroleum Authority (NPA), the National Oil Company and an Institute of Petroleum and Geology.

In terms of good governance Mr. Pires is augmenting previous efforts by introducing the Timor-Leste Transparency Model (TLTM) to ensure that the people of East Timor are well informed about the petroleum sector.

Mr. Pires has a strong “After Oil” policy, encouraging his Government and people to see oil as only an engine of growth for the economic development and for the nation not to grow dependent on oil and for the Government to invest in the non-oil sector.

External links 
  Alfredo Pires's profile

1964 births
Living people
People from Bobonaro District
East Timorese people of Portuguese descent
East Timorese politicians
Federation University Australia alumni